Corbevax is a protein subunit COVID-19 vaccine developed by Texas Children's Hospital Center for Vaccine Development and Baylor College of Medicine in Houston, Texas and  Dynavax technologies based in Emeryville, California. It is licensed to Indian biopharmaceutical firm Biological E. Limited (BioE) for development and production.

Technology
The vaccine consists of a version of the receptor binding domain (RBD) of the SARS‑CoV‑2 spike protein, together with the adjuvants aluminium hydroxide gel and CpG 1018. The protein is produced by the yeast Pichia pastoris; the process is similar to that of existing Hepatitis B vaccines.

Manufacturing
In April 2021, the U.S. International Development Finance Corporation (DFC) announced that it would fund the expansion of Biological E's manufacturing capabilities, so that it could produce at least 1 billion doses by the end of 2022.

History

Clinical trials
A phase I clinical trial was carried out to evaluate the safety and immunogenicity of the vaccine candidate in about 360 participants. The phase II concluded in April 2021.

In April 2021, the Drugs Controller General of India permitted the vaccine candidate to start phase III clinical trials. A total of 1,268 healthy participants between the age of 18 and 80 years to be selected from 15 sites across India for the trial and intended to be part of a larger global Phase III study. As of December 2021, Biological E announced positive results, but some experts criticized the lack of public data from phase III trials. The developer specifically claimed the vaccine appeared to be over 90% effective against the original variant based on antibody levels.

Society and culture

Legal status 
On 28 December 2021, India approved the vaccine for emergency use.

Economics 
The development of the vaccine was financed with $7 million from mostly private investors, including a $1 million donation by Tito's Vodka. The vaccine technology is given patent-free to manufacturers, although Baylor College receives a fee.

On 3 June 2021, India's Ministry of Health and Family Welfare pre-ordered 300 million doses of Corbevax.

The BioE company estimated the vaccine to be priced at ₹250 (around $3) per dose and may even be priced below ₹400 (around $5) for two doses in India.

The vaccine is planned for use in low-income countries to increase vaccine access and equity, and thus is designed to be easily storable and manufactured with traditional processes. The vaccine is not patented and is planned to be openly licensed under COVAX.

In January 2022, the scientists developing Corbevax have declared that no G7 countries were yet funding the open source vaccine and reiterated their plea to the US federal government and G7 countries to provide funding for the mass production and distribution of Corbevax, arguing that Moderna had received much more support.

References

External links

Clinical trials
Indian COVID-19 vaccines
Science and technology in India
Protein subunit vaccines
Products introduced in 2021